Frederick Julian Mitchell (30 July 1901 – 3 June 1979) was the 12th Bishop of Kilmore, Elphin and Ardagh who was later translated to Down and Dromore.

Educated at Campbell College and Trinity College, Dublin and ordained in 1925, his first post was a curacy at  St Mary, Belfast. He then held incumbencies at St Polycarp Finaghy and the United Parishes of Kilconriola and Ballyclug, and was later appointed Rural Dean of Ballymena, his last post before ordination to the episcopate. He was elected to Down and Dromore on 18 October 1955 (his election was confirmed the same day) and he retired from that see on 7 November 1969.

References

1901 births
People educated at Campbell College
Alumni of Trinity College Dublin
20th-century Anglican bishops in Ireland
Bishops of Kilmore, Elphin and Ardagh
Bishops of Down and Dromore
1979 deaths